Poplar Dock is a small dock in east London. It connects to the Blackwall Basin of the West India Docks and, although independent of this system, has never had a direct connection to the Thames.

Originally a series of reservoirs built by the West India Dock Company and completed in 1828, Poplar Dock was converted into a railway dock, in the days before any of London's enclosed dock systems were connected to the railway network. The dock was built by the East & West India Docks and Birmingham Junction Railway Company (later the North London Railway Company) and connected to the company's goods yard at Chalk Farm. It was alone among the docks to remain outside the control of the Port of London Authority in 1909, and remained in the ownership of British Rail until closure in 1981.

Because of its lack of a direct connection to the river, its operators needed the agreement of the owners of the West India Docks for uses which did not compete directly with their interests. In its early years the dock was used mainly to import coal from the Northeast of England.

Much of the dock survives today as a mooring connected to Blackwall Basin. Poplar Dock is now known as Poplar Dock Marina. It was opened by Queen Elizabeth II in 1999. The marina is overlooked to the south by Landons Close (part of the Jamestown Harbour development) and to the west by Boardwalk Place.

See also
 Jamestown Harbour

References 

London docks
History of the London Borough of Tower Hamlets
Buildings and structures in the London Borough of Tower Hamlets
History of rail transport in London
North London Railway
Marinas in England
Port of London